"Kim" was the 30th episode of the M*A*S*H television series, and sixth episode of season two. The episode aired on October 20, 1973.

Plot
Among the wounded arriving at the hospital one day is a five-year-old boy, Kim.  The hospital staff believe him to be an orphan, and conspire to keep him at the camp for longer than necessary (rather than sending him on to the care of an orphanage) so they can care for him themselves.  Trapper is especially taken with the child, and makes plans to adopt him.

One afternoon, while Frank and Margaret are supposed to be watching Kim, the boy wanders off into a minefield.  A helicopter-assisted rescue is successful, and once on safe ground, Trapper hugs the boy, to the delight of gathering 4077th personnel.  Meanwhile, a truck pulls up, driven by Sister Teresa, who runs the local orphanage.  Her passenger—a young Korean woman—sees Kim and rushes to him.  Sister Teresa explains that the woman came to her, looking for her missing son.  As the three drive away, Kim waves goodbye to Trapper.

Blooper
A model of a Bell UH-1 Iroquois hangs from the ceiling in Henry Blake's office. This model helicopter first flew in 1956 (Wikipedia article), over two years after the end of the Korean War.

External links

M*A*S*H (season 2) episodes
1973 American television episodes